De iure belli ac pacis (English: On the Law of War and Peace) is a 1625 book in Latin, written by Hugo Grotius and published in Paris, on the legal status of war. It is now regarded as a foundational work in international law. The work takes up Alberico Gentili's De jure belli of 1598, as demonstrated by Thomas Erskine Holland.

Content

Its content owed much to Spanish theologians of the previous century, particularly Francisco de Vitoria and Francisco Suarez, working in the Catholic tradition of natural law.

Grotius began writing the work while in prison in the Netherlands. He completed it in 1623, at Senlis, in the company of Dirck Graswinckel.

According to Pieter Geyl:
It is an attempt by a theologically and classically educated jurist to base upon law order and security in the community of states as well as in the national society in which he had grown up. In the rather naïve rationalism, the belief in reason as the lord of life, is revealed the spiritual son of Erasmus.

In particular, this work is remembered for the sentence:
Et haec quidem quae iam diximus, locum aliquem haberent etiamsi daremus, quod sine summo scelere dari nequit, non esse Deum, aut non curari ab eo negotia humana.
What we have been saying would have a degree of validity even if we should concede that which cannot be conceded without the utmost wickedness: that there is no God, or that the affairs of men are of no concern to Him.
Such a concept has been synthesized with the famous Latin phrase etsi Deus non daretur, which means "even when God were assumed not to exist" but is normally translated "as if God did not exist".

References

Further reading
Cornelis van Vollenhoven. On the Genesis of De Iure Belli ac Pacis. Amsterdam: Koninklijke Akademie van Wetenschappen, 1924.
Translations
Francis W. Kelsey, with the collaboration of Arthur E. R. Boak, trans. De iure belli ac pacis libri tres. Washington, D.C.: Carnegie Institution of Washington, 1913–1925 (reprint: Buffalo, NY: William H. Hein, 1995).
Stephen C. Neff, trans. Hugo Grotius: On the Law of War and Peace. Student edn. Cambridge: Cambridge University Press, 2012.

External links

Online text (English text, abridged, PDF)
Online text (English text, abridged, HTML and TXT)
Online Text (English text, unabridged, HTML and PDF)

1625 books
International law
Books by Hugo Grotius
Law books
Legal history of the Dutch Republic
1625 in law
17th-century Latin books